Based on a True Story is the debut studio album by American rapper Trick Daddy, and the only album released under his 'Trick Daddy Dollars' alias. It was released on July 29, 1997, through Slip-N-Slide/Warlock Records. Production was handled by Alvin Clark, Darren "DJ Spin" Rudnick, Devastator X, Mike "Fresh" McCray, Righteous Funk Boogie, and Trak & Tek. It features guest appearances from Buddy Roe, JT Money, Verb and Jamal. The album peaked at number 59 on the Top R&B/Hip-Hop Albums in the United States.

The album has sold 350,000+ copies. This is his only album as of 2021 not to have the word "thug" in the title.

Track listing

Charts

References

External links

1997 debut albums
Trick Daddy albums
Warlock Records albums